"She's Got Rhythm" is a song written by Brian Wilson, Mike Love and Ron Altbach for the American rock band The Beach Boys. It was the opening track on their 1978 album M.I.U. Album.

"She's Got Rhythm" took the basic backing track of Celebration's song "Lookin' Good" off of their album Almost Summer.

Personnel

The Beach Boys
Brian Wilson – lead vocals

References

The Beach Boys songs
Songs written by Brian Wilson
Songs written by Mike Love
1978 songs